One Night in Tehran is an Iranian film written and directed by Farhad Najafi.

Plot
New York, Tokyo and Mumbai all have their own nightlife. And so does Tehran; a nocturnal underground world unlike any other - A girl looking for her happiness within the chaos of this swallowing world gets into a night cab, unaware of how her life is going to change forever.

Awards and nominations

References

External links
 

2019 films
2010s Persian-language films
Iranian action films
Films set in Tehran
2019 action films